Elk Valley Provincial Park is a provincial park in British Columbia, Canada. It covers an area of 81 hectares and is located about 18 kilometres north of Fernie. It is not identified by any formal provincial park signage; rather it is signed by the Ministry of Transportation as the "Olson Rest Area".

Mining 
Elk Valley Provincial Park is very close to Elk Valley (British Columbia), which has metallurgical coal.

References

External links
BC Parks: Elk Valley Provincial Park
BC Geographical Names: Elk Valley Park

Provincial parks of British Columbia
Parks in the Regional District of East Kootenay
Year of establishment missing